Nora is a 2008 documentary film.

Synopsis 
Nora is based on the life of dancer Nora Chipaumire, who was born in Zimbabwe in 1965. In the film, Nora returns to the landscape of her childhood and travels through the vivid memories of her youth. Using performance and dance, she brings her story to life in a swift poem of sounds and images. Shot entirely on location in South Africa, Nora portrays a multitude of local performers and dancers of all ages, from schoolchildren to grandmothers. Much of the film's music was specially composed by the legend of Zimbabwean music, Thomas Mapfumo.

Awards 
 Dance on Camera, New York 2009
 Black Maria Film Festival 2009
 Honolulu Film Festival 2009
 FIFA, Festival of Films on Art Canada 2009
 Ann Arbor Film Festival 2009

External links 

2008 films
Mozambican documentary films
British short documentary films
American short documentary films
2008 short documentary films
Documentary films about dance
Mozambican short films
2000s American films
2000s British films